Skyways may refer to:
Skyway, walk bridge
Skyways (British airline), defunct British airline also known as Skyways Limited
Skyways (Swedish airline), defunct Swedish airline also known as Skyways Express
Skyways (TV series), Australian TV serial broadcast 1979-1981
Skyways Coach-Air Limited